Simani-ye Sofla (also Romanized as Sīmānī-ye Soflá; also known as Sīmāni, Sīmānī-ye Kūchak, and Sīmānī-ye Pā’īn) is a village in Howmeh-ye Shomali Rural District, in the Central District of Eslamabad-e Gharb County, Kermanshah Province, Iran. At the 2006 census, its population was 73, in 17 families.

References 

Populated places in Eslamabad-e Gharb County